Supervoting stock is a "class of stock that provides its holders with larger than proportionate voting rights compared with another class of stock issued by the same company." It enables a limited number of stockholders to control a company.

Usually, the purpose of the super voting shares is to give key company insiders greater control over the company's voting rights, and thus its board and corporate actions. The existence of super voting shares can also be an effective defense against hostile takeovers, since key insiders can maintain majority voting control of their company without actually owning more than half of the outstanding shares.

See also 
Preferred stock

References 

Stock market